Charles William Russell Kingsley V.R.D. A.R.I.N.A. (30 January 1910 – 13 February 1996) was a British yacht designer and surveyor.

His early life was spent on the Isle of Wight where he designed, built and sailed small boats or canoes of canvas covered wooden framed design. For most of his working life he was employed in London as a Victualling Clerk for the Orient Line. His hobby, which consumed much of his spare time, was yacht designing and surveying although most of the design activity reduced considerably after the Second World War. During the war he served in the RNVR, initially (from 1933) in the pay branch - he had poor eyesight - but volunteered successfully to transfer to the Special Branch reaching the rank of Lieutenant Commander in 1947.

He was a member of the Little Ship Club, which he joined aged 19, and won first prize in their yacht design competition in 1933, for which he received the sum of £5 5s. The competition was judged by, among others, Laurent Giles. In December 1935 he had a new design for an 8-ton cruiser (based to a certain extent on his prize winning design) published in Yachting Monthly magazine.

He was an associate of the Institution of Naval Architects (later the Royal Institution of Naval Architects) between 1935 and 1964.

Yachts

Foie
Official Lloyd's number 165032.

Auxiliary Bermudian cutter. Long keel yacht of 9 tons and 36.0 ft LOA. Built by A. Everson & Sons of Woodbridge in 1936.

Evarne
Official Lloyd's numbers and signal letters: 166103 MMNM, then 400070 from between 1965 and 1978.

Auxiliary cutter with Bermudian rig. Long keel yacht with counter stern and spoon bow. 11 tons, 37.4 ft LOA. Built by A. Everson & Sons of Woodbridge, Suffolk in 1937.

Photographed (unknown date) by Beken & Son of Cowes. Photograph number 28728. Sail number 170.

Isonda

Official Lloyd's Number 185994.

Auxiliary cutter with Bermudian rig. Full keel yacht with classic counter stern. 8 tons, 33 ft LOA. Built by Sharp & Brewster of Woodbridge, Suffolk in 1937.
Built according to the winning design from the Little Ship Club competition.

Keryl

Official Lloyd's Number 165038. MVNU (1980)

Auxiliary cutter. 13 tons, 40.3 ft LOA. Built by Harry King & Sons at Pin Mill in 1937.

In 2005 Keryl and her owner, Simon Woodhouse, were the subject of the first two episodes of a TV programme Boat Yard presented by Tom Cunliffe. They were first screened in 2005 on the Discovery Realtime TV channel.

References

1996 deaths
People from the Isle of Wight
1910 births
British yacht designers
Royal Naval Volunteer Reserve personnel of World War II